Odfjell Drilling Ltd. is an oil drilling, well service, and engineering company.

Current operations
The company has 3 divisions:
 Mobile Offshore Drilling - Owns 6 drillships and operates in Norway, United Kingdom, Angola, Vietnam, and Brazil. 
 Drilling & Technology - provides platform drilling, project management and engineering services from offices in Bergen, Stavanger, and Aberdeen.
 Well Services - provides casing and tubing running services (TRS), drill tool rental, and well intervention services to the onshore and offshore oil and gas industry.

History
The company was established in 1973 as an affiliate of Odfjell. In 1974, the first rigs were delivered from Aker ASA, and started service for ELF and Saga Petroleum. The first production drilling contract was awarded by Statoil on the Statfjord oil field in 1979. In 1984, the company expanded to the United Kingdom with a semi-submersible rig for Hamilton Brothers Oil & Gas. In 1989 the company opened an office in Singapore. In 1995, the company decided to concentrate on the North Sea.

In 2013, the company became a public company via an initial public offering on the Oslo Stock Exchange.

In 2017, the company sold its 37% interest in Robotic Drilling Systems, which it acquired in 2014.

In 2018, the company announced plans to expand its rig count from 4 to 6 to 10.

In 2018, the company acquired a drilling rig from Samsung.

See also 

 List of oilfield service companies

References

External links
 

Drilling rig operators
Engineering companies of Norway
Service companies of Norway
Offshore engineering
Petroleum industry in Norway
Companies based in Bergen
Technology companies established in 1973
Companies listed on the Oslo Stock Exchange
Norwegian companies established in 1973